The final of the men's 100 metre backstroke event at the 1984 Summer Olympics was held in the McDonald's Olympic Swim Stadium in Los Angeles, California, on August 3, 1984.

Records
Prior to this competition, the existing world and Olympic records were as follows.

Results

Heats
Rule: The eight fastest swimmers advance to final A (Q), while the next eight to final B (q).

Finals

Final B

Final A

References

External links
 Official Report
 USA Swimming

B
Men's events at the 1984 Summer Olympics